Jimmy Crowley (born 1950) is an Irish folk musician and song collector. He has specialized in collecting and playing traditional songs from County Cork.

Crowley started collecting music at the age of 16. His recordings popularised local songs such as "Johnny Jump Up", "Salonika", "The Boys of Fairhill" and "The Armoured Car".

Early years

Crowley was born in Douglas, County Cork. His father was a tenor singer with a love of opera. After school he was apprenticed to a cabinet-maker. He formed Stoker's Lodge, the other members being Mick Murphy, Christy Twomey and Johnny "Fang" Murphy. Eoin Ó Riabhaigh joined some time later. The band was named after the gate lodge of the Stoker estate in Frankfield, Cork, near Crowley's boyhood home. Mícheál Ó Domhnaill of The Bothy Band was an early mentor and produced their first two albums. The band members drifted apart in the mid -80's but reformed in 2014 for one time to mark the passing of Christy Twomey the previous year.

After the demise of Stoker's Lodge, he formed The Electric Band. They released a reggae version of "The Boys of Fairhill" which went straight into the pop charts.

Crowley married Evelyn Murray in 1980. They separated in 2006.

Later career
From the 1990s Crowley pursued a solo career. From December 2002 onwards he provided a weekly column for Saturday's Evening Echo about ballads and folklore. Crowley spent several years in America, from 2006 onwards, basing himself in Florida.

In 2014 Crowley published a large volume Songs From The Beautiful City: Cork Urban Ballads with musical notation and lyrics and with related anecdotes on the facing page.

In 2017 his ballad opera, Red Patriots, was staged at the Triskel Theatre, Cork. Set in the context of Mao Tse-tung's Cultural Revolution, it is the story of an apprentice musician who falls for a girl revolutionary and portrays the burning of the Marxist bookshop in Cork, an actual event from the seventies.

Crowley holds a degree from University College Cork in folklore and Irish, taken as a mature student.

Discography
With Stoker's Lodge
 Boys of Fairhill (1975)
 Camphouse Ballads (1979)

Solo
 Jimmy mo Mhíle Stór (1985)
 My Love is a Tall Ship (1997)
 Uncorked! (1998)
 Sex, Sea and Sedition (1999)
 Irish Eyes

References

External links
 
 Mick Hanly

1950 births
Living people
Irish folk musicians
Musicians from Cork (city)
Alumni of University College Cork